Sõtke may refer to several places in Estonia:

Sõtke, Narva-Jõesuu, a village in Vaivara Parish, Ida-Viru County
Sõtke, Rapla County, village in Märjamaa Parish, Rapla County
Sõtke (river), a river in Ida-Viru County